Itoupava Norte is a neighborhood of Blumenau, Santa Catarina, Brazil located on the left bank of the River Itajai-Açu. As of 2015, it has a population of 19,327, and an area of 6.3 km2.

References

Neighbourhoods in Santa Catarina (state)